TNT is the ninth studio album by American country music singer Tanya Tucker. It was released on November 6, 1978, by MCA Records. Working with a new producer in Jerry Goldstein, Tucker drifts away from her earlier country style to do a much more rock-based effort. She covers well-known rock songs originally performed by such artists as Buddy Holly ("Not Fade Away"), Elvis Presley ("Heartbreak Hotel"), and Chuck Berry ("Brown Eyed Handsome Man"). Tucker also covers John Prine's "Angel from Montgomery". The album was Tucker's second-highest ranked ever on the Billboard  Country charts at #2, and even reached #54 in the Pop category. Released singles and their Billboard positions were: "Texas (When I Die)" at #5, "Not Fade Away" at #70, and "I'm the Singer, You're the Song" at #18. While not necessarily embraced by the country music establishment, the album garnered critical and commercial success. It was certified Gold by the RIAA and earned her a Grammy nomination for Best Rock Vocal Performance, Female.

Critical reception

Billboard published a review of the album in the November 18, 1978 issue, which said, "Tucker's newest release sheds a new light on her singing and image. Working within a pop framework, Tucker's vocals convey a wholesome richness, evident in her rendition of John Prine's "Angel from Montgomery" (in which he also gives background vocal help), "Not Fade Away" and others. The inside photo makes Tucker out to be a sexpot, a ploy that gives her broader appeal. Tucker is backed by a tight band which utilizes both country and rock orchestrations and strings for sweetening."

The review in the November 11, 1978 issue of Cashbox said, "If country fans have raised an eyebrow at the changes Dolly Parton has made lately, they certainly aren't ready for the 'new'
Tanya Tucker. Beyond a shadow of a doubt, the cover graphics are the most blatantly sexual of any album jacket ever released by a country artist. And the music inside is tough LA rock. Tanya does throw in a small dose of country, but this is in no way a country album. At any rate, it is a fine album and should garner airplay and sales in all markets."

Track listing

Production
Produced By Jerry Goldstein
Engineered & Mixed By Ed Barton
Digital Editing: Milan Bogdan
Mastered By Glenn Meadows

Personnel
Tanya Tucker - lead vocals
Paul Leim - drums, percussion, electronic drums
Jerry Scheff - bass guitar
John Hobbs - piano
Lonnie Jordan - organ
Billy Joe Walker Jr. - acoustic and electric guitar, mandolin
Jerry Swallow - electric guitar, dobro, mandolin
Mickey Raphael - harmonica
Larry Muhoberac - string arrangements
Curt Becher, Joe Chemay, Dash Crofts, Phil Everly, Venetta Fields, Jerry Goldstein, La Costa, Michael McGinnis, Brent Nelson, Joey Paige, Jody Payne, John Prine, Jim Seals, Julia Tillman-Waters, Tanya Tucker, Luther Waters, Oren Waters, Lorna Willard - background vocals

Charts

Weekly charts

Year-end charts

References

1978 albums
Tanya Tucker albums
albums produced by Jerry Goldstein (producer)
MCA Records albums